Nicole Lindroos is a game designer who has worked primarily on role-playing games.

Career
After twice applying to culinary school, Nicole Lindroos entered the game industry in 1989. Lindroos was one of the Minnesota locals who joined Lion Rampant after the company was started.  Lindroos joined White Wolf Publishing when the two companies merged in 1990. In 1991, Lindroos left White Wolf and returned to Minnesota, where she went to work for Atlas Games, formed by John Nephew with help from other Lion Rampant alumni such as Lindroos and Darin "Woody" Eblom. Later, Lindroos played a sample copy of James Wallis's Once Upon a Time at Gen Con 24; it was subsequently published by Atlas Games, and remained in print with Atlas through various editions. Lindroos became a freelancer, writing an adventure for Jonathan Tweet's Everway, and also co-founded Adventures Unlimited magazine (1995-1996), the first issue of which included adventures for games she had been involved with, including Ars Magica, Vampire: The Masquerade, and Over the Edge. Lindroos and her husband Chris Pramas formed Green Ronin Publishing in 2000. By 2001, Pramas and Lindroos brought on the third member of the Green Ronin team, Hal Mangold. When Green Ronin was incorporated as an LLC, Pramas, Lindroos, and Mangold came on as the three partners.

Lindroos has volunteered on the board of directors of the Game Manufacturer's Association, the Origins Awards committee, and as the chairman of the Academy of Adventure Gaming Arts and Design.

Lindroos lives in Seattle with her husband Chris and daughter Katherine.

References

External links
 

Atlas Games people
Living people
Role-playing game designers
Year of birth missing (living people)